Figgja or Figga is a  long river in the municipality of Steinkjer in Trøndelag county, Norway. The river drains the lake Leksdalsvatnet and flows north into Beitstadfjorden, the inner part of Trondheimsfjord, at the town of Steinkjer.

See also
List of rivers in Norway

References

Steinkjer
Rivers of Trøndelag
Rivers of Norway